Martin Finnegan (8 October 1979 – 3 May 2008) was an Irish motorcycle racer.

Career
Born in Lusk, County Dublin, Finnegan took up riding at a young age. At first he went grass track racing where he tasted success. In his later teens his boss at the time, Tony Carton, offered Martin the lend of a bike to try his hand at circuit racing. They went out that day and Martin did almost 100 laps and caught the bug.

A winner of 43 Irish road races since 1997, in addition to winning the 2000 Junior Newcomers Manx Grand Prix, Finnegan scored a podium at the 2005 Isle of Man TT where he became the fastest Irishman to lap the course at over 127 mph.

At the 2007 Isle of Man TT, Finnegan brought back to racing at competitive level on the Island the iconic Italian MV Agusta brand in the TT Superstock race, where he missed the podium reaching the 4th place on board of an F4 bike.

Death and inquest
Finnegan died in Tandragee, Northern Ireland, in 2008 whilst competing in the Supersport race at the Tandragee 100 race meeting. As he approached a corner, his front brake failed. Whilst trying to stop the bike, his rear wheel hit a bump in the road which flipped Finnegan and his bike into a bank. Ryan Farquhar, who was directly behind Finnegan on the track, said that the rear tyre of Finnegan's bike was covered in oil. On 7 May 2008, Finnegan's funeral took place in his hometown of Lusk. About 2,000 motorcyclists travelled to Lusk to attend.

On 9 January 2012, the inquest into his death commenced. It was stated that after the crash a banjo bolt on the bike was found to be loose, however his mechanics and race scrutineers maintained that the bolt was tight before the start of the race and so could not have caused the brake failure which led to the crash. Instead, it was suggested by the scrutineer that brake knock-back was "the only logical explanation". Farquhar doubted that knock back was the cause, stating that he had not experienced it in over 500 races. The following day, coroner John Leckey delivered the verdict, stating "Having carefully considered all the evidence in conjunction with the agreed position of the experts, I am able to conclude that, on the balance of probabilities, the loose banjo bolt was the cause of failure of the front brake."

Legacy
In 2009, Adrian Archibald received the inaugural Martin Finnegan Trophy for achieving the fastest lap by an Irishman at the Isle of Man TT. Michael Dunlop then won the award for two consecutive years in 2010 and 2011.

Winners of the Martin Finnegan Trophy

See also
Richard Britton

References

External links
Isle of Man TT Official Site
Motorcycle News

1979 births
2008 deaths
Sportspeople from County Dublin
Isle of Man TT riders
Irish motorcycle racers
Manx Grand Prix racers
Motorcycle racers who died while racing
Sport deaths in Northern Ireland